David H. Doherty is a current justice of the Ontario Court of Appeal and considered by many to be the author of leading judgments responsible for shaping criminal law in Canada.

He was initially appointed September 1, 1990, and was previously a judge of the Supreme Court of Ontario from September 2, 1988.

Justice Doherty was presented with the 2019 G. Arthur Martin award by the Toronto Criminal Lawyers Association.

References

Year of birth missing (living people)
Living people
Justices of the Court of Appeal for Ontario